

Beorhtred was a medieval Bishop of Lindsey.

Beorhtred was consecrated between 836 and 839. He died between 862 and 866, perhaps later.

Citations

References

External links
 

Bishops of Lindsey